Trent Robert Blank (born August 31, 1989) is an American professional baseball coach for the Seattle Mariners of Major League Baseball.

Blank attended Columbia High School in Columbia, Illinois, and Baylor University, where he played college baseball for the Baylor Bears. He played professional baseball in the Colorado Rockies organization for three years.

In 2020, Blank served as the acting bullpen coach for the Mariners. He will become the fulltime bullpen coach in 2021.

References

External links

Living people
1989 births
Baseball players from St. Louis
Baseball pitchers
Major League Baseball bullpen coaches
Seattle Mariners coaches
Baylor Bears baseball players
Tri-City Dust Devils players
Asheville Tourists players